The Étendard was an express train that linked Paris and Bordeaux in France.  Introduced in 1968, it was operated by the Société Nationale des Chemins de fer français (SNCF), and was initially a Rapide. 

The train's name, L'Étendard (literally, "The Standard") is the French word for "banner", and commonly refers to military banners, as carried on parades and into battle.

From 1971 to 1984, the Étendard was a first-class-only Trans Europ Express (TEE), and between 1973 and 1975, the southbound service was an international train linking Paris with Spain.  It reverted to being a two-class Rapide in June 1984 and was discontinued entirely with the introduction of TGV service between Paris and Bordeaux, in 1990.

Route

Core route
The train normally ran daily except Sundays southbound and daily except Saturdays northbound.

Variation
Starting in 1973, the Étendards southbound route was extended along the Bordeaux–Irun railway line to terminate in Irun, Spain, and its northbound route was extended to start in Hendaye, France, stations located on opposite sides of the French–Spanish border.  During the summer timetable periods, these extensions were served on all operating days (six days a week), except certain holidays.  During other seasons, the portion between Bordeaux and Irun or Hendaye usually operated only one day a week: southbound on Saturdays, northbound on Sundays. These extensions lasted until 1975.

Formation (consist)
The Étendard was usually hauled by one of SNCF's 1.5 kV DC, Class CC 6500 electric locomotives.  A headboard bearing the name of the train was attached to the front of the locomotive, a practice also applied to those locomotives when they were hauling the Aquitaine and Le Capitole.

When the Étendard became a TEE in 1971, its formation of rolling stock was a rake of SNCF , being an A4Dtux, three A8tu, six A8u, one A3rtu and one Vru.  The coaches were painted in a distinctive red, orange, light grey and slate grey livery.

Throughout the Étendards existence, its dining car was staffed by the Compagnie Internationale des Wagons-Lits (CIWL).

See also

 History of rail transport in France
 List of named passenger trains of Europe
 TGV Atlantique

References

Notes

Bibliography
 
 
 

Named passenger trains of France
Named passenger trains of Spain
Trans Europ Express
Railway services introduced in 1968